The 2020 BDO World Professional Darts Championship was the 43rd and final World Championship organised by the British Darts Organisation, and the only staging at the Indigo at The O2 in London. It was the first BDO World Darts Championship not held at the Lakeside Country Club since 1985. Gabriel Pascaru and Thibault Tricole became the first players from Romania and France respectively to play in a World Darts Championship. Three-time men's defending champion Glen Durrant was absent from the event, having switched to the Professional Darts Corporation in January 2019. The reigning women's champion was Mikuru Suzuki. She successfully retained her title, by defeating Lisa Ashton 3–0 in the final. Wayne Warren won his first world title with a 7–4 win over fellow Welshman Jim Williams in the final. He became the oldest player ever to win a world title. 

It was the final World Darts Championship organised by the BDO due to the collapse of the organisation in September 2020. Following the tournament, the World Darts Federation announced plans to launch the WDF World Championship in 2020, but due to the COVID-19 pandemic these plans were pushed back to 2022.

Prize money 
On 30 December 2019, less than a week before the tournament was due to start, it was announced that due to ticket sales of only 15%, the prize money would be 'reduced somewhat'. A reduction from £359,000 to £150,000 was reported in the media but prize money aside from the winners was unconfirmed. It was thought that the prize money would be reduced by half in most cases, although this was unconfirmed. On 15 January 2020, the prize fund was finally revealed with the men's champion portion dropping from £100,000 last year to only £23,000 this year. On 11 February 2020, it was reported that players had still not received any prize money, despite payment being due by 9 February, 28 days after the tournament ended.

Men's

Women's

Men's

Format and qualifiers

1–16 in BDO rankingsSeeded in First round
  Wesley Harms (second round)
  Jim Williams (runner-up)
  Richard Veenstra (second round)
  Dave Parletti (first round)
  Wayne Warren (winner)
  Nick Kenny (first round)
  Martijn Kleermaker (second round)
  Willem Mandigers (first round)
  Scott Mitchell (semi-finals)
  Adam Smith-Neale (first round)
  Mario Vandenbogaerde (semi-finals)
  Andy Hamilton (second round)
  Gary Robson (first round)
  David Evans (quarter-finals)
  Ryan Hogarth (second round)
  Scott Waites (quarter-finals)

17–24 in BDO rankingsFirst round

25–27 in BDO rankingsPreliminary round

World MasterPreliminary round

Regional Table qualifiersPreliminary round
  Justin Thompson (first round) 
  Andreas Harrysson (first round)
  Paul Hogan (quarter-finals)
  David Cameron (preliminary round)
  Gabriel Pascaru (preliminary round)
  Darren Herewini (first round)
  Joe Chaney (preliminary round)
  Thibault Tricole (first round)

Playoff qualifiersPreliminary round
  Nick Fullwell (first round)
  Justin Hood (first round)
  Scott Williams (preliminary round)
  Ben Hazel (second round)

Draw bracket

Preliminary round
All matches are the first to 3 sets

Last 32

Women's

Format and qualifiers

1–8 in BDO rankingsSeeded in first round
  Lisa Ashton (Runner up)
  Mikuru Suzuki (winner)
  Aileen de Graaf (quarter-finals)
  Fallon Sherrock
  Deta Hedman (first round)
  Beau Greaves (semi-finals)
  Anastasia Dobromyslova (quarter-finals)
  Lorraine Winstanley (quarter-finals)

9–16 in BDO rankingsFirst round

Playoff qualifiers
  Corrine Hammond (semi-finals)
  Kirsty Hutchinson (first round)

Draw

Youth

References

External links
Official website

BDO World Darts Championships
BDO
BDO
BDO
International sports competitions in London
BDO